Something in the Rain is a 2018 South Korean television series directed by Ahn Pan-seok and starring Son Ye-jin, Jung Hae-in and Jang So-yeon. The series marks Son Ye-jin's small screen comeback after five years. It aired from March 30 to May 19, 2018 on JTBC's Fridays and Saturdays at 23:00 (KST) time slot. 

It is available for streaming on Netflix, and on Disney+ in Japan starting February 2022.

Plot
The series explores the relationship of two people as they go from being "just acquaintances" to "a genuine couple". Jin-ah (Son Ye-jin) is a district supervisor in her 30s at the coffeehouse franchise Coffee Bay (an actual Korean chain) and Joon-hee (Jung Hae-in) is an animator in his early 30s at video game developer Smilegate Entertainment. When he returns from working abroad, he reconnects with Jin-ah — who also happens to be best friends with Joon-hee's sister since childhood. The episodes give an intimate look into how they fall in love, struggle with their age differences (considered to be Taboo in some circles), and find the courage to go public with their relationship to everyone around them.

A secondary storyline is about the struggles female employees face in the company Jin-ah where she is employed as they try to climb the corporate ladder amidst severe sexual harassment, mistreatment, discrimination, and career sabotage from their male managers. A culture considered to be normal but unspoken among South Korean companies about sexism.

Themes of taboos
The driving narrative around the story centers around South Korean taboos concerning relationships.

 Dating Taboos: An older female dating a younger male is considered scandalous.
 Familial Taboos: People who grow up without parents or present parental figures are considered "unfit" for marriage.
 Job Taboos: People should only associate with people who are of a certain educational background, occupational position, or wealthy class status.
 Career Taboos: Women are expected to go out and be flirtatious during team dinners to show they value "team unity".
 Drinking Taboos: It is customary to pour your colleague's glass first before and vice versa. If you pour for yourself, it indicates a fractured relationship.
 Food Taboos: Usually if an older woman buys a younger male food frequently, it's because of a brother-sister relationship.

Cast

Main
 Son Ye-jin as Yoon Jin-ah, a single woman age 35 who works as a store supervisor in a coffee franchise. Despite being an easygoing person, she lives a rather hollow life. After being dumped by her boyfriend, she suddenly develops romantic feelings towards her best friend's younger brother Joon-hee.
 Jung Hae-in as Seo Joon-hee, Kyung-seon's younger brother age 31 who is a character animation designer at a computer video game company. He has returned to the country from his work in the USA after three years. While getting reacquainted with his older sister's best friend Jin-ah, he protects her a couple times and falls in love with her.
 Jang So-yeon as Seo Kyung-seon, Joon-hee's older sister age 35 and Jin-ah's best friend who runs a coffee shop.

Supporting

Employees at Coffee Bay
 Jung Yoo-jin as Kang Se-young, the most popular and ambitious colleague of Jin-ah; she requests to supervise Kyung-seon's store as a result of having a crush on Joon-hee.
 Joo Min-kyung as Geum Bo-ra, a veteran colleague that Jin-ah can confide in.
 Lee Joo-young as Lee Ye-eun, youngest colleague of Jin-ah.
  as Kim Dong-woo
  as Gong Cheol-goo, deputy chief who manages Jin-ah and other store supervisors, unpopular among female subordinates due to his behavior.
 Seo Jeong-yeon as Jung Young-in, vice president & marketing director of the coffee franchise.
  as Choi Joong-mo, deputy chief.
 Park Hyuk-kwon as Nam Ho-gyun, vice president & director of the coffee franchise, whom Gong Cheol-goo reports to.
  as Jo Kyung-sik, CEO of the coffee franchise.

Yoon Jin-ah's family
 Wi Ha-joon as Yoon Seung-ho, Jin-ah's younger brother and Joon-hee's best friend.
 Gil Hae-yeon as Kim Mi-yeon, Jin-ah's mother, who is obsessed with finding Jin-ah a husband from a well-regarded family.
  as Yoon Sang-ki, Jin-ah's father.

Others
  as Lee Gyu-min, Jin-ah's ex-boyfriend, a lawyer from a well-respected family. He had an affair with another woman.
  as Kim Seung-chul, Joon-hee's colleague and university friend.

Special appearances
 Ji Hye-ran as Gyu-min's new girlfriend (Ep. 1)
 Cho Soo-hyang as Joon-hee's friend (Ep. 6)
 Oh Hee-joon as Joon-hee's friend
 Kim Chang-wan as Joon-hee's father.

Production
The first script reading of the cast was held on January 25, 2018, at JTBC building in Sangam-dong.

As a result of the drama's commercial success, a three-day reward vacation to Japan was awarded to the cast and the crew which was scheduled from May 29–31, 2018.

Original soundtrack

"Stand by Your Man" sung by Carla Bruni, and "Save the Last Dance for Me" by Bruce Willis are played frequently in the series.

Part 1

Part 2

Viewership

Awards and nominations

Remake
In February 2022, it was confirmed that Something in the Rain is set for an Indian remake.

On March 3, 2022, it was announced that iQIYI would release a Chinese remake of the series titled The Way Love Should Be, starring Angelababy. The platform also gained the rights to exclusively air the show in China, marking it the first South Korean TV show to be approved for streaming in the country since the Korean content ban.

References

Notes

External links
  
 
 

Korean-language television shows
JTBC television dramas
2018 South Korean television series debuts
2018 South Korean television series endings
South Korean romance television series
Television series by KeyEast
Television series by Drama House